Man flu is a pejorative phrase that refers to the idea that men, when they have a common cold, experience and self-report symptoms of greater severity, akin to those experienced during the flu. However, there is evidence to suggest that viral infections affect men more than women.

Popular culture 
A web-based survey of readers of Nuts magazine in late 2006 stirred interest in this notion, which was criticized as unscientific and unreliable. A poll conducted for a painkiller manufacturer in 2008 suggested that such exaggeration is possibly just as prevalent in women.

The concept of man flu has been a source of controversy when used in advertising.

Scientific basis 
A study published in 2009 was reported by a number of outlets including The Daily Telegraph as supporting a scientific basis for the existence of "man flu." However, the study had nothing to do with the flu (the experiment was related to bacterial, not viral, infection) and was performed on genetically modified mice rather than human beings, so the results are not necessarily applicable to humans.

According to researchers at Cambridge University, evolutionary factors may have led women to develop more rigorous immune systems than men due to differing reproductive strategies.
In addition, a 2011 study conducted at the University of Queensland suggests that female hormones (such as oestrogens) aid pre-menopausal women in fighting infections, but the protection is lost after menopause.

2017 medical review
In the Christmas 2017 edition of The BMJ, a review of existing research found some evidence to indicate that men were more frequently hospitalized and had higher influenza-related death rates than women. The review also suggested that the underlying cause could be evolutionary hormonal sex-differences affecting the immune system. 

Further, the review pointed out that while "man flu" is known worldwide, no research had been conducted to specifically define the phenomenon – a situation which could lead to males receiving less medical attention than their condition actually merited.

While the BMJ article was written in a light-hearted tone – in keeping with the traditions of its Christmas edition – the science behind it was real.

See also
Sex differences in humans

References

English-language slang
Stereotypes of men